Reitz is a small maize, wheat and cattle farming town located in the east of the Free State province of South Africa.

Town and township 
The original town, Reitz, lies upon the northwestern hillside. On the opposite hill lies the town's township, Petsana.

The population data of Reitz (as of the 2011 Census):

     Population = 3362

     Population group:
     White (54.1%)
     Black African (43%)
     Other (1.6%)
     Indian or Asian (0.7%)
     Coloured (0.62%)

     First language:
     Afrikaans (55.24%)
     Sesotho (31.96%)
     isiZulu (5.45%)
     English (2.88%)
     Other (1.39%)
     isiXhosa (1.01%)
     Setswana (0.76%)
     Sign language (0.76%)
     Sepedi (0.25%)
     isiNdebele (0.25%)
     Xitsonga (0.03%)

Petsana's population data (as of the 2011 Census) is:

     Population = 16,821

     Population group:
     Black African (99.44%)
     Coloured (0.22%)
     Other (0.12%)
     Indian or Asian (0.12%)
     White (0.10%)

     First language:
     Sesotho (73.42%)
     isiZulu (22.56%)
     Sign language (1.14%)
     isiXhosa (1.05%)
     Afrikaans (0.61%)
     English (0.48%)
     Other (0.32%)
     isiNdebele (0.15%)
     Setswana (0.11%)
     Xitsonga (0.10%)
     Sepedi (0.05%)
     Siswati (0.01%)

Local economy
Petsana is a mainly residential area with schools and small shops and businesses, but very few industrial work sites. Most of the working population either goes out daily to work on farms in the area or they work in town. Reitz has an industrial area, most notably the steel and farming equipment construction company, Van Zyl's Staalwerke. Reitz is also home to the headquarters of the co-op group, VKB. The VKB Group is a modern, dynamic agricultural enterprise that has, since its establishment in 1919, continuously focused on accomplishing solutions for the changing and diverse needs of agricultural producers and related stakeholders. It addresses the basic needs for agricultural inputs, mechanization, handling and marketing of grain, financing and insurance.  
Another company that employs a lot of local workers is Grain Field Chickens. A subsidiary of VKB Argiculture (Pty) Ltd, Grain Field is a technologically advanced abattoir, currently slaughting between 800 000 to 850 000 chickens per week.

Agriculture 

The town has one of the largest maize silos in the southern hemisphere and is a major maize growing community.

History and name
Founded in 1889, the town was previously known as Singer's Post, its name was changed to Amsterdam, and again to its current name Reitz after the Orange Free State president, Francis William Reitz.

Location 

Nearby towns 
The nearest settlements or towns and their respective distances are listed here:
 Daniëlsrus – 25 km
 Bethlehem – 49.9 km
 Frankfort – 58.2 km
 Heilbron – 75.5 km
 Villiers – 87.5 km
 Vrede – 90.3 km

References

Helpful links 
https://web.archive.org/web/20090206235601/http://www.routes.co.za/fs/reitz/index.html

Populated places in the Nketoana Local Municipality
Populated places established in 1889